This page provides supplementary chemical data on 1-Hexene.

Material Safety Data Sheet  

The handling of this chemical may incur notable safety precautions. It is highly recommended that you seek the Material Safety Datasheet (MSDS) for this chemical from a reliable source such as SIRI, and follow its directions.

MSDS

Structure and properties

Thermodynamic properties

Spectral data

References 

 Lide, D. R. (Ed.) (1996). CRC Handbook of Chemistry and Physics (76th Edn.). Boca Raton (FL):CRC Press. .
 Spectral Database for Organic Compounds SDBS

Hexene
Chemical data pages cleanup